Ancestral Alliance, stylized as ATA Alliance, is an electoral alliance in Turkey that was established on 11 March 2023 and consists of the Victory Party, the Justice Party, the My Country Party and the Turkey Alliance Party. The candidate they have chosen for the 2023 Turkish presidential election is Sinan Oğan, a former Nationalist Movement Party deputy. The True Party left the alliance after Sinan Oğan was nominated as a candidate.

History

Establishment 
In June 2022, it was suggested that a new alliance of five parties, including the Victory Party, would be formed Ümit Özdağ said about these allegations, "There is no such thing. I am not in preparation for an alliance". In the following dates, the Chairman of the Homeland Party Muharrem İnce, the Chairman of the Victory Party Ümit Özdağ, the Chairman of the Justice Party Vecdet Öz and the Chairman of the True Party Rifat Serdaroğlu made statements stating that they were in talks about the electoral alliance. On 4 March 2023, Ümit Özdağ said that 24 hours ago, Muharrem İnce sent the message "I am withdrawing from this alliance, make your right" to the WhatsApp group where the alliance meeting was held.

Proclamation 
The declaration of the Ancestor Alliance, consisting of the Victory Party, Justice Party, My Country Party and the Turkey Alliance Party, took place on 11 March 2023 at the Victory Party Headquarters, and it was announced that the candidate they had chosen for the 2023 Turkish presidential election was Sinan Oğan, a former Nationalist Movement Party deputy. Upon the nomination of Sinan Oğan, the True Party announced that it left the alliance shortly before the announcement time. Right Party Chairman Rifat Serdaroğlu said, "We believe that nominating a third presidential candidate will serve the People's Alliance".

Members

References

2023 establishments in Turkey
2023 Turkish presidential election
Political parties established in 2023
Political party alliances in Turkey